Stand by Your Van is a retrospective compilation live album by the band Sublime. Tracks 1 to 11 were recorded live at Komotion, San Francisco, on September 9, 1994. Track 12 was recorded live at The Tressel Tavern, Everett, WA in November 1994. Tracks 13 and 14 were recorded on the Warped Tour at Asbury Park, NJ in August, 1995. Track 15 was recorded at The Palace, Hollywood in October 1995. Track 16 was recorded at the House of Blues, Hollywood in April 1996. Lead singer and guitarist Bradley Nowell died less than two months later while still on tour.

Track listing
"Don't Push" – 3:00
"Right Back" – 2:42
"New Thrash" – 1:03
"Let's Go Get Stoned" – 4:49
"Greatest Hits" – 2:57
"Date Rape" – 3:49
"S.T.P." – 2:46
"Badfish" – 3:04
"D.J.s" – 4:13
"Work That We Do" – 3:25
"Pool Shark" – 2:16
"Ebin" – 3:28
"All You Need" – 2:44
"Waiting for My Ruca" – 2:19
"Caress Me Down" – 4:22
"KRS-One" – 2:25

Samples
At the very end of the last track, "KRS-One", the opening bass riff from The Descendents' "Myage" can be faintly heard.

Chart positions

Album

Personnel
Sublime
Bradley Nowell - vocals, guitar
Eric Wilson - bass
Bud Gaugh - drums

References

Sublime (band) albums
1998 live albums
MCA Records live albums
Compilation albums published posthumously
Live albums published posthumously